Granville State Forest is a Massachusetts state park located in the towns of Granville and Tolland in the southern Berkshire Hills along the state's southern border with Connecticut. The park is managed by the Department of Conservation and Recreation (DCR). It is adjacent to Connecticut's Tunxis State Forest.

Description
This area was once the Tunxis Native American tribe's hunting and fishing grounds. After discovery by English pioneer Samuel Hubbard in 1749 much of it was converted to open pasture and farmland. Under protection, the forest is regenerating with typical northern conifers and hardwoods.

Activities and amenities
Camping: Granville offers a camping area with accessible restrooms and shower facilities. Camping season is from late-May through mid-October. Camping is available only at designated sites and no wilderness camping is allowed. There are a limited number of sites available for RVs up to 35 feet long. There are no hook-ups or trailer waste station. 
Trails: Trails may be used for hiking, walking, horseback riding, mountain biking, snowshoeing, and cross-country skiing.
The forest also offers fishing and restricted hunting.

References

External links
Granville State Forest Department of Conservation and Recreation
Trail Map Department of Conservation and Recreation

State parks of Massachusetts
Massachusetts state forests
Massachusetts natural resources
Parks in Hampden County, Massachusetts
Campgrounds in Massachusetts